Michael Davidson (born  December 18, 1944 in Oakland, California) is an American poet.

Life and work
Davidson has written eight books of poetry as well as numerous historical, cultural and critical works. He has been affiliated with the University of California at San Diego (UCSD) since 1974 and as a professor of American literature since 1988 with areas of study and research in Modern Poetry, Cultural Studies, Gender Studies, and Disability Studies. 

Davidson served as the first curator of the Mandeville Department of Special Collections (UCSD) where the George Oppen papers are stored. The Archive for New Poetry  is now a major campus, community and international resource for studying post-1945 English-language poetry, and is one of the four largest American poetry collections in the U.S. The archive contains holdings that emphasize the ongoing “countertradition” in recent American writing – particularly the Objectivist poets, the Black Mountain poets, the San Francisco Renaissance, the New York School, and the Language School.

Davidson, who recently became Deaf, has written extensively on disability issues, most recently "Hearing Things: The Scandal of Speech in Deaf Performance," in Disability Studies: Enabling the Humanities, "Phantom Limbs: Film Noir and the Disabled Body," GLQ 9:1-2 (2003), and "Strange Blood: Hemophobia and the Unexplored Boundaries of Queer Nation," in Beyond the Boundary: Reconstructing Cultural Identity in a Multicultural Context. A collection of essays on disability was published as Concerto for the Left Hand: Disability and the Defamiliar Body (University of Michigan). Another recent critical work, On the Outskirts of Form: Practicing Cultural Poetics, was published in 2011 by Wesleyan University Press. This latter book gathered his essays concerning formally innovative poetry from modernists such as Mina Loy, George Oppen, and Wallace Stevens to current practitioners such as Cristina Rivera-Garza, Heriberto Yépez, Lisa Robertson, and Mark Nowak.

In addition to being a widely published poet and poetry editor (he is represented in the 2004 edition of Best American Poetry by a poem entitled "Bad Modernism"), Davidson is known for insightful literary criticism, his work in disability studies, and for the meticulous editing of the monumental George Oppen, New Collected Poems.

Bibliography

Poetry
 "Two Views of Pears. Sand Dollar Books 1973
The Mutabilities & The Foul Papers. Sand Dollar Books 1976Summer Letters. Santa Barbara, CA: Black Sparrow Press 1977 Published in pamphlet form as Sparrow 61The Prose of Fact. Berkeley: The Figures, 1981The Landing of Rochambeau. Providence, R.I.: Burning Deck, 1985Analogy of the Ion. Great Barrington, MA: The Figures, 1988Post Hoc. Bolinas, Calif.: Avenue B, 1990 The Arcades. O Books, Fall 1999Bleed Through: New and Selected Poems. Coffee House Press, 2013
editor of George Oppen: New Collected Poems. New York: New Directions, 2002

ProseThe San Francisco Renaissance: Poetics and Community at Mid-Century. Cambridge: Cambridge University Press, 1989. 
 Ghostlier Demarcations: Modern Poetry and the Material Word. Berkeley: University of California Press, 1997. Guys Like Us: Citing Masculinity in Cold War Poetics. U of Chicago Press, 2003.Concerto for the Left Hand: Disability and the Defamiliar Body. University of Michigan Press, 2008.The Outskirts of Form: Practicing Cultural Poetics. Wesleyan University Press, 2011."Introduction: American Poetry, 2000-2009." Contemporary Literature 52.4 (Winter, 2011)."Women Writing Disability." Introduction to special issue of, "Women Writing Disability."  Legacy: A Journal of American Women Writers. 30.1 (2013)"Disability Poetics." The Oxford Handbook of Modern and Contemporary Poetry. Ed. Cary Nelson. New York: Oxford University Press, 2012.Invalid Modernism: Disability and the Missing Body of the Aesthetic. Oxford University Press, 2019.

Articles
"Notes beyond the Notes: Wallace Stevens and Contemporary Poetics," Wallace Stevens: The Poetics of Modernism, ed. Albert Gelpi. Cambridge: Cambridge University Press, 1985. 
"From the Latin Speculum: The Modern Poet as Philologist," Contemporary Literature, 28.2 (Summer 1987): 187-205. 
"Dismantling 'Mantis:' Reification and Objectivist Poetics," American Literary History, 3.3 (Fall 1991): 521-541. 
"Marginality in the Margins: Robert Duncan's Textual Politics," Contemporary Literature, 33.2 (Summer 1992): 275-301. 
"'When the world strips down and rouges up:' Redressing Whitman," Breaking Bounds: Whitman and American Cultural Studies, ed. Betsy Erkkila. New York: Oxford University Press, 1996. 
"The Lady from Shanghai: California Orientalism and 'guys like us,'" Western American Literature (Winter 2001). 
"Strange Blood: Hemophobia and the Unexplored Boundaries of Queer Nation." Beyond the Boundary: American Identity and Multiculturalism. Ed. Tim Powell. New Brunswick: Rutgers U Press, 1999. 39-60. 
"Hearing Things: The Scandal of Voice in Deaf Performance," Enabling the Humanities: A Disability Studies Sourcebook, eds. Sharon Snyder, Brenda Jo Brueggemann, and Rosemarie Garland-Thomson. New York: Modern Language Association, 2001.

Critical studies and reviews of Davidson's workLeningrad 

Notes

External links

Re-siting poetry through American Sign Language (ASL)
The Scandal of Speech in Deaf Performance essay at ubuweb
Davidson on collecting the poems of George Oppen
Davidson on Louis Zukofsky's "Mantis"
Discourse in Poetry: Bakhtin and Extensions of the Dialogical  pdf-reprint of this article & Answering Motion, both of these Davidson pieces as they appeared in Code of Signals (ed. Michael Palmer, 1983). Available again in e-book at Duration Press's out-of-print-archive''.

American male poets
1944 births
Disability studies academics
Gender studies academics
Living people
Objectivist poets
Language poets